Hyeonjeong non (English: Exposition of the Correct) was an essay written at the beginning of the Joseon period, defending Buddhism against the attacks of a rising antagonistic Neo-Confucian movement. It was written in a single fascicle, by the Korean Buddhist monk Gihwa (1376-1433).

See also
Korean philosophy
Korean Buddhism
Korean Confucianism

External links

 English translation by Charles Muller

Korean Buddhist texts
Buddhist apologetic works
Mahayana texts